A Barr body (named after discoverer Murray Barr) or X-chromatin is an inactive X chromosome.  In species with  XY sex-determination (including humans), females typically have two X chromosomes, and one is rendered inactive in a process called lyonization. Errors in chromosome separation can also result in male and female individuals with extra X chromosomes.  The Lyon hypothesis states that in cells with multiple X chromosomes, all but one are inactivated early in embryonic development  in mammals. The  X chromosomes that become inactivated are chosen randomly, except in marsupials and in some extra-embryonic tissues of some placental mammals, in which the X chromosome from the sperm is always deactivated.

In humans with euploidy, a genotypical female (46, XX karyotype) has one Barr body per somatic cell nucleus, while a genotypical male (46, XY) has none. The Barr body can be seen in the interphase nucleus as a darkly staining small mass in contact with the nucleus membrane. Barr bodies can be seen in neutrophils at the rim of the nucleus.

In humans with more than one X chromosome, the number of Barr bodies visible at interphase is always one fewer than the total number of X chromosomes. For example, people with Klinefelter syndrome (47, XXY) have a single Barr body, and people with a 47, XXX karyotype have two Barr bodies.

Mechanism
Someone with two X chromosomes (such as most human females) has only one Barr body per somatic cell, while someone with one X chromosome (such as most human males) has none.

Mammalian X-chromosome inactivation is initiated from the X inactivation centre or Xic, usually found near the centromere. The center contains twelve genes, seven of which code for proteins, five for untranslated RNAs, of which only two are known to play an active role in the X inactivation process, Xist and Tsix. The centre also appears to be important in chromosome counting: ensuring that random inactivation only takes place when two or more X-chromosomes are present. The provision of an extra artificial Xic in early embryogenesis can induce inactivation of the single X found in male cells.

The roles of Xist and Tsix appear to be antagonistic. The loss of Tsix expression on the future inactive X chromosome results in an increase in levels of Xist around the Xic. Meanwhile, on the future active X Tsix levels are maintained; thus the levels of Xist remain low. This shift allows Xist to begin coating the future inactive chromosome, spreading out from the Xic. In non-random inactivation this choice appears to be fixed and current evidence suggests that the maternally inherited gene may be imprinted. Variations in Xi frequency have been reported with age, pregnancy, the use of oral contraceptives, fluctuations in menstrual cycle and neoplasia.

It is thought that this constitutes the mechanism of choice, and allows downstream processes to establish the compact state of the Barr body. These changes include histone modifications, such as histone H3 methylation (i.e. H3K27me3 by PRC2 which is recruited by Xist) and histone H2A ubiquitination, as well as direct modification of the DNA itself, via the methylation of CpG sites. These changes help inactivate gene expression on the inactive X-chromosome and to bring about its compaction to form the Barr body.

Reactivation of a Barr body is also possible, and has been seen in breast cancer patients. One study showed that the frequency of Barr bodies in breast carcinoma were significantly lower than in healthy controls, indicating reactivation of these once inactivated X chromosomes.

See also
 X-inactivation
 Sex-determination system
 Demethylation
 Acetylation
 Xist
 Tsix (gene)

References
Links to full text articles are provided where access is free, in other cases only the abstract has been linked.

Further reading
  (Web Edition, Free access)
 Turnpenny & Ellard: Emery's Elements of Medical Genetics 13E (http://www.studentconsult.com/content/default.cfm?ISBN=9780702029172&ID=HC006029)

Genetics